The End of Time is a 2012 Swiss-Canadian documentary film written and directed by Peter Mettler on the loose subject of time.

Synopsis 
Mettler interviews a range of people, including particle physicists at the Large Hadron Collider, DJ Richie Hawtin, an environmentalist, activists who seek to renovate Detroit, a hermit who lives on an island threatened by a volcano, and Indian Buddhists, who perform a funeral ritual.  Each give their interpretation of what time is and what it means to them.  The final interview subject, Mettler's mother, says that we must use what time we are given well.

Cast 
 Peter Mettler
 Richie Hawtin

Reception 
Rotten Tomatoes, a review aggregator, reports an approval rating of 78%, based on nine critical reviews with an average rating of 7.58/10.  Metacritic rated it 56/100 based on six reviews.  Jay Weissberg of Variety wrote, "Intermittently interesting but more often pretentious, this sluggish exploration of time as real and conceived concepts rarely does more than regurgitate philosophical platitudes without locating the depth to make them interesting."  Stephen Dalton of The Hollywood Reporter wrote, "Any sense of narrative momentum or intellectual focus quickly unravels as the film evolves into an almost wordless symphony of disconnected images, sounds and music. But the nature-heavy montages are mostly beautiful and bizarre enough to excuse the film’s pretentious excesses."  Peter Howell of The Toronto Star rated it 3.5/4 stars and wrote, "Mettler makes a profound statement on what makes all of us tick."  Liam Lacey of The Globe and Mail rated it 2.5/4 stars and wrote that the film "offers lots of opportunities to gaze and muse" but does not offer insights in the subject.  Miriam Bale of The New York Times called the film "a form of enforced meditation."  Eric Hynes of Time Out New York wrote, "Peter Mettler's ruminative, frequently astounding essay film doesn’t just contemplate this notion; it aims to cinematically embody it."  Calum Marsh of The Village Voice praised the cinematography but said that the film's pontificating is unnecessary.

The film was included in the Toronto International Film Festival's list of "Canada's Top Ten" feature films of 2012. It has been nominated for a 2013 Swiss Film Award for best documentary film, best film score, and best cinematography.

References

External links 
 
 
 
 

2012 films
2012 documentary films
Canadian documentary films
Swiss documentary films
2010s English-language films
Films about time
National Film Board of Canada documentaries
Films directed by Peter Mettler
2010s Canadian films